is a feminine Japanese given name which is also used as a surname.

Possible writings
Nanase can be written using different kanji characters and can mean:
as a given name
七瀬, "seven, rapids"
菜々瀬, "greens, rapids"
奈々瀬, "what, rapids"
那々瀬, "what, rapids"

as a surname
七瀬, "seven, rapids"
The given name can also be written in hiragana or katakana.

People
with the given name Nanase
 Nanase Aikawa (七瀬), a Japanese rock singer
 Nanase Hoshii (七瀬), pseudonym of Yuma Hoshino, Japanese singer
 Nanase Ohkawa (七瀬), a member of the all-female manga-creating team Clamp
 Nanase Nishino (七瀬), a member of the Japanese idol group Nogizaka46
 Nanase Kiryu (七瀬), Japanese football player

with the surname Nanase
 Aoi Nanase (七瀬), a Japanese manga artist and illustrator
 Ayaka Nanase (七瀬), Japanese voice actress 
 Hikaru Nanase, pseudonym for Japanese singer and composer Masumi Itō

Fictional characters
with the given name Nanase
 Nanase (七瀬), a character in the Street Fighter EX video game
 Nanase Akatsuki (七瀬), a character in the manga series Mamotte! Lollipop
 Nanase Hida (七瀬), a main heroine of the manga series Telepathic Wanderers
 Nanase Kudō (七瀬), a character in the Japanese light novel series Kaze no Stigma
 Nanase Matsuura (ナナセ), a character from the anime series Macross Frontier
Nanase Matoba, a supporting character who is a secretary of the main antagonist of the ongoing manga/anime of Natsume's Book of Friends
with the surname Nanase
 Miyuki Nanase (七瀬), a character in the manga and anime series Kindaichi Case Files
 Rumi Nanase (七瀬), a character in the adult visual novel One: Kagayaku Kisetsu e
 Haruka Nanase, a main character in the anime series Free! - Iwatobi Swim Club
 Narue Nagase (七瀬 成恵), a female protagonist in the science fiction anime series The World of Narue
 Yū Nanase (七瀬 優), one of the characters in the dating simulation game Sentimental Graffiti
 Yoshi Nanase (ﾅﾅｾ ﾖｼ), a main character from the adventure game 1bitHeart
Yui Nanase (七瀬 ゆい), a side character in the anime series Go! Princess PreCure

Other uses
 Nanase Futatabi, a novel written by Yasutaka Tsutsui

Japanese feminine given names
Japanese-language surnames